Čovek (trans. "A Man") is the 1978 debut studio album by Yugoslav rock band Gordi.

Čovek is Gordi's only studio album to be recorded with bass guitarist Zdenko Pomper, who was replaced by Slobodan Svrdlan shortly after the album release.

The album features the song "Misli" ("Thoughts"), which was previously released as the B-side of the single "Žeđ" ("Thirst"), the last single released by Gordi leader Zlatko Manojlović's previous band Dah. The lyrics for the song "Odlazim u noć" ("I'm Leaving into the Night") were written by Predrag Vuković, percussionist of the band Igra Staklenih Perli.

Track listing

Personnel
Zlatko Manojlović - vocals, guitar, producer
Goran Manojlović - vocals, keyboard
Zdenko Pomper - bass guitar
Stevan Milutinović - drums

Additional personnel
Miro Bevc - sound engineer
Aco Razbotnik - recorded by
Kostja Gatnik - cover design

Legacy
In 2015 Čovek album cover, designed by Kostja Gatnik, was ranked 85th on the list of 100 Greatest Album Covers of Yugoslav Rock published by web magazine Balkanrock.

References 

Čovek at Discogs

External links
Čovek at Discogs

Gordi (band) albums
1978 debut albums
ZKP RTLJ albums